The National History Bee and Bowl (NHBB) are nationwide history quiz competitions for high school, middle school, and elementary students in the United States. International Academic Competitions oversees both NHBB and the comparable International History Bee and Bowl for students outside the United States. Both the National History Bee and the National History Bowl were contested for the first time in the 2010-2011 academic year. Students first compete at regional qualifying tournaments, from which the top students advance to the National Championships for the History Bee and History Bowl, which are held each spring. The competitions were founded in June 2010 by David Madden, a former 19-day champion on Jeopardy!, who serves as Executive Director for both The National History Bee and The National History Bowl. At high school level tournaments of the National History Bee and Bowl, students also have the opportunity to compete in the National Qualifying Exam of the United States Geography Championships. Beginning in the fall of 2013, NHBB also introduced the US History Bee, a competition for high school students focusing solely on American history.

National History Bee

National History Bee High School Competition
At the High School level, the National History Bee consists of two stages, the Regional Bees and the National Championships. Some Regional Bees are designated as State Championships - these, however, are still open to out-of-state students, and do not require any prior qualification. Three different sets of questions (A, B, and C) are used for the Regional Bees; students may thus compete up to three times in advance of the National Championships, as long as they have not yet played the designated question set that a Regional Bee is using. The High School level of The National History Bee is open to younger students, though the different levels of The National History Bee function completely separately regarding qualification for the National Championships. Additionally, the High School level features a Junior Varsity division, for students up through 10th grade, though middle school and even elementary school-aged children are welcome to participate in these as well.

Regional Bees feature three preliminary rounds of 30 questions each, followed by a 1, 2, or 3 stage final, depending on how many students are taking part. The placement of students is random for each round and in each round, contestants compete in a room with up to seven other students. As at all Regional and National competitions overseen by NHBB, students use a lockout buzzer system to ring in when they know the answer to a question. When the question is read, the contestant may interrupt the moderator to answer the question early, but if a student misses the question, they cannot ring in again. Students receive 1 point per question answered correctly. The first and second student to ring in incorrectly never receive a penalty, but if a third person buzzes in and answers incorrectly before the question is finished, they will be receive a one-point penalty, and the question is dropped. If a third person buzzes in after the question is read and answers incorrectly, they receive no penalty, but the question is still dropped. If a contestant reaches 8 points at any time during the round, they are no longer allowed to answer. Reaching 8 points results in the contestant receiving a bonus, with more bonus points possible if the 8-question limit is reached earlier in the game.

Students whose total preliminary score is in the top half of the field at any Regional Bee qualify for the National Championships. The number of students who advance to the Regional Bee Finals, as well as the structure of the Regional Bee Finals, varies from event to event.

National Championships
Since 2012, the High School National Championships of The National History Bee have been held at the Crystal Gateway Marriott in Arlington, Virginia on a Sunday in late April. There are six preliminary rounds of competition, with the top students then advancing to three final stages. The final stage of the Varsity Division pits four students against each other; the first to a certain number of points (10-15) wins. The final stage of the Junior Varsity Division pits two students against each other; the first to 15 is the champion. In 2013, approximately 190 students competed at the Varsity Division, and 140 competed in the Junior Varsity Division at the National Championships. In 2017 and 2018, the Middle School National Championships of the National History Bee were held at the Atlanta Marriott Marquis.  The 2019 Middle School National Championships were held at the Hyatt Regency O'Hare in Chicago. The 2020 National Championships for the Varsity and Junior Varsity Divisions have been rescheduled to December 3-6 and the 2020 National Championships for the Middle School and Elementary School Divisions have been rescheduled to December 27-30.

Varsity Division National Champions

Junior Varsity Division National Champions

National History Bee Middle School Competition
The National History Bee Middle School Competition was launched across the US in the fall of the 2011-2012 school year. The Middle School level differs from the high school level by containing an additional official competition stage, the Online Regional Qualifying Exam (ORQE). Typically, the top 4 students at a school (often determined by an intramural competition) are allowed to take the ORQE although students may also register individually for it. The top 120 students within a region (for the 2013-14 year, there are 37 of these) then qualify for the Regional Bees, where they are seeded according to their ORQE results. In contrast with the High School Regional Bees, the Regional Bees at the Middle School level are not held at the same dates and sites as the Middle School level Regional Bowls. Furthermore, while High School level students may compete at up to three different Regional Bees, with no geographic restrictions on participation, Middle School (and Elementary School level students) may only compete at one Regional Bee, and the site is determined by geographic proximity to their school or homeschool association (or home in the case of students who have signed up independently).

The Regional Bees are structurally similar to the Regional Bees at the high school level, with three preliminary rounds in which all students compete followed by a final, although the scoring system differs slightly. The Regional Bees also feature competition on a lockout buzzer system with "pyramidal questions." These questions are of paragraph length and progress from more difficult clues to easier clues. Students can ring in with the buzzer at any time during the reading of the questions; thus rewarding students with deeper knowledge.

National Championships
In the inaugural 2011-2012 competition season, the winner of each Regional Bee won a trip to Washington, DC where the final rounds were held at Trinity Washington University and televised on HISTORY. The winning student, Tajin Rogers of McLean, VA won a $50,000 scholarship. Since 2012, HISTORY and Houghton Mifflin Harcourt have remained sponsors of all levels of NHBB by providing prizes at the National Championships and outreach assistance, though no further NHBB events have been televised to date.

For the 2012-2013 competition season, the format of the National Championships was changed so that the top 40% of finishers at the Regional Bees qualified for Nationals. Competitors though then had to cover their travel to the National Championship site in Atlanta, as well as pay an additional entry fee (which also mirrors the high school level). Approximately 400 students competed in the 2013 National Championships which was won by Jonathan Tran of Portland, Oregon. The 2014 National Championships were also held in Atlanta along these lines. In 2015, the National Championships was held at the Louisville Marriott Downtown, the Hyatt Regency Louisville, and the Kentucky International Convention Center in Louisville, Kentucky. In 2016, the competition took place at the Donald E. Stephens Convention Center and the Hyatt Regency Chicago O'Hare Airport.

Middle School Division National Champions

National History Bee Elementary Division Competition
The National History Bee was opened to elementary school-aged students for the 2012-2013 competition season. At the Elementary School level, the ORQE functions the same way as it does at the Middle School level. In 2012-2013, elementary school-aged students competed together with middle school-aged students at the Regional Bees. However, for purposes of qualifying for the National Championships elementary school-aged students only needed to finish in the top 40% of elementary school-aged students at any given site, not in the top 40% of all students combined. 
Beginning with the 2013-14 competition season, elementary school-aged students will also compete in a separate group of students at the Regional Bees, as long as entry numbers allow for this. The Regional Bees for the Middle School and Elementary School levels will still be held at the same times and locations, though.

National Championships
The National Championships of the National History Bee Elementary School Competition are held at the same site on the same date as the Middle School National Championships. At the inaugural 2013 National Championships for the Elementary School Competition, approximately 50 students competed, and Foster Michaelis of Johns Creek, Georgia was the champion.  The 2014 National Championship was held in Atlanta, Georgia and Siddharth Kamannavar a third grader from Santa Clara, California became the youngest ever winner of National History Bee and was crowned champion. The 2017 National Championships was held in Atlanta, GA again, and Siddharth Kamannavar, now a 6th grader was crowned champion again. Siddharth Kamannavar also won the Citizen Bee and topped the Military History Subject Bee and Geography Subject Bee.

Elementary Division National Champions

National History Bowl
The National History Bowl is an entirely different competition from the National History Bee, as the competitors qualify and compete as teams in a buzzer-based format very similar to that used by standard high school quiz bowl tournaments. As with the National History Bee, the National History Bowl is contested at the High School (including separate Varsity and Junior Varsity Divisions) and Middle School level.

National History Bowl High School Competition
The National History Bowl is contested at the same sites as the National History Bee for the High School level, however, the Bee and the Bowl are held at different times during the day so that students can compete in both. The History Bowl, like the History Bee, is run on 3 sets of questions at the Regional level - the question set used (A, B, or C) is the same for both the Bee and Bowl at any given site. For the 2013-2014 competition season, approximately 105 Regional tournaments are being held across the USA. Typically, tournaments are held on Saturdays and last all day - some events are held on Sundays or Federal Holidays, or, more rarely, after school. National History Bowl High School level tournaments feature a Varsity and Junior Varsity division - JV teams may not carry 11th or 12th graders as players. A typical tournament will feature 5 rounds of preliminary matches with up to 5 playoff rounds then subsequently contested among the top teams in the preliminaries. Up to four students compete at any one time on a team, though teams at Regionals can carry two substitutes (there is no limit on substitutes at Nationals) and there is no minimum number of players a team needs to have.

The round format of the National History Bowl differs slightly from a traditional quiz bowl format. Each game is divided into four quarters, and there are no penalties for incorrect answers at any point within the game. However, if a student on one team buzzes in and answers a tossup question incorrectly, that student's teammates are prohibited from ringing in and trying to answer that particular question. As in the National History Bee, the tossup questions are "pyramidal," that is, they become easier towards the end of the question, which rewards depth of knowledge for students able to ring in early.

The first quarter consists of ten tossups, which are each worth 10 points. There are no bonus points for correctly answering the tossup question early, or bonus questions for getting the tossup question correct.

The second quarter consists of eight tossups, also worth 10 points each. However, in the second quarter, if a team answers a tossup question correctly, they get a chance at a related bonus question worth an extra ten points if correctly answered. On the bonus questions, team members can confer with each other, in contrast with the tossups. If a team answers the bonus question incorrectly, the moderator simply reveals the answer; it does not then go over to the other team.

In the third quarter, teams are given a choice of three categories of questions to choose from, with the trailing team deciding first. Each team is given one minute to answer up to 8 short questions on that category, with each question being worth 10 points. If all questions are answered correctly, a 20-point bonus is added. Each question a team answers incorrectly in their category is given to the other team to answer for the same number of points, but only after the full 60 seconds are over. If time elapses, then only those questions that have been read (and answered incorrectly) are turned over to the other team; unheard questions remain unread to the other team.
 
The fourth quarter consists of eight relatively longer tossup questions. If students ring in early, they can earn 30 or 20 points, or 10, if they answer correctly at the end of the question. Ties are broken, so that each game ends in a win and a loss, but tiebreaker questions do not have a point value, for playoff seeding purposes.

National History Bowl High School National Championships
Teams qualify for the National History Bowl High School National Championships by finishing with at least a .500 winning percentage in their preliminary matches at any of the Regional tournament sites. Teams may also qualify by winning a playoff game, if they enter the playoffs with a losing record. The National History Bowl High School National Championships are also held in conjunction with the History Bee High School National Championships (i.e. on the same weekend). At the High School National Championships, the majority of matches (including all playoff rounds) are held at the Crystal Gateway Marriott in Arlington, VA, though roughly a third of the matches are contested at sites throughout Arlington and Washington, DC. These sites have includes embassies, museums of the Smithsonian Institutions, historic mansions, and other culturally significant sites. 
In 2013, 132 Varsity and 66 Junior Varsity teams competed at the National Championships. The winning Varsity team from Bellarmine College Preparatory consisted of a single student, Sameer Rai, who also won the National History Bee that year. At the National Championships, there are also separate National Championship titles awarded to the Small Schools (i.e. non-magnet public high schools with 1000 or fewer students) who advance the farthest in the tournament - this began in 2012 for the Varsity Division and 2013 for the Junior Varsity Division. There is not a separate draw for these teams.
The National Championships features seeded groups of 6 teams in the morning preliminary rounds who play a round robin over five games. The top three teams in each group advance to the Upper Bracket rounds in the afternoon, where they play another round robin over five games. The bottom three teams in each group play either 3 or 5 consolation rounds in the afternoon. The top Upper Bracket teams in the afternoon advance to a single elimination playoff, beginning on Saturday evening, and continuing into Sunday afternoon (after the History Bee preliminary rounds). The playoff matches at the National Championships are slightly longer than standard matches. In 2016, Aptakisic Junior High School made history by becoming the first Junior High team to win in the JV History Bowl for Small School.

Varsity Division National Champions

Varsity Division Small School National Champions

Junior Varsity Division National Champions

Junior Varsity Division Small School National Champions

National History Bowl Middle School Competition
Since 2011, the National History Bowl has welcomed middle school teams. High School level tournaments are always open to middle school participation in the Junior Varsity Division. Certain tournaments may also contain a separate middle school division, though beginning in 2013-2014, this has become rare, as a separate set of National History Bowl Regional tournaments are planned for middle school teams independent of high school participation. The round structure at the Middle School level is identical to the High School level, although the questions tend to be shorter.

National History Bowl Middle School and Elementary National Championships
The National History Bowl Middle School National Championships were held in the Washington, DC area in 2012 and 2013. Beginning in 2014, they will be held in conjunction with the National History Bee Middle School National Championships. The structure of the National History Bowl Middle School National Championships has varied considerably over its first two years, and will be shifted again in 2019 to accommodate a greater number of participating teams. 
In 2019, an Elementary Division in the National History Bowl National Championships was introduced for teams consisting of students in 6th grade and younger.

Middle School Division National Champions

Elementary Division National Champions

See also
 Academic Competition Federation
 International History Bee and Bowl
 International History Olympiad
 National Academic Quiz Tournaments
 Partnership for Academic Competition Excellence
 Quiz bowl

References

External links
 National History Bowl 
 National History Bee - High School Division 
 National History Bee - Middle and Elementary School Division 
 United States History Bee 
 International History Bee and Bowl Global Homepage 
 High School Academic Pyramid Questions 

Competitions in the United States
2010 establishments in the United States
International Academic Competitions